Barrie Munro Collins is a researcher, PhD holder, and writer for Living Marxism and Spiked whose revisionist views on the Rwandan genocide have led to accusations of Rwandan genocide denial. On the other hand, he was also credited with "the most tightly argued, well documented and provocative challenge to the conventional wisdom".

Works

References

Living people
Historians of Rwanda
Year of birth missing (living people)
21st-century English historians